Thabo Joy Moloi (born 23 March 1994) is a South African footballer who plays for JDR Stars as a defender.

Club career
Moloi joined the SuperSport United academy in 2006 and was promoted to the first-team squad in January 2013.  He made his league debut against Orlando Pirates on 13 February 2013. Moloi was awarded the club's Young Player of the Season award for the 2013–14 season.

References

External links
 

1994 births
Living people
South African soccer players
Association football defenders
People from Vereeniging
Sportspeople from Gauteng
SuperSport United F.C. players
AmaZulu F.C. players
University of Pretoria F.C. players
Pretoria Callies F.C. players
JDR Stars F.C. players